Dr John Richard Harper-Smith MBE, known as Richard Harper-Smith, is a medical doctor in Tetford, Lincolnshire. He is most well known for being one of two founding doctors behind the Lincolnshire Integrated Voluntary Emergency Service (LIVES).

Order of the British Empire 
In the 2008 Birthday Honours, Harper-Smith was awarded Membership to the Order of the British Empire, for his voluntary work with LIVES.

References

People from Lincolnshire
British general practitioners